Pieter Jacobus "Pierre" Rabie (1917–1997) was a senior South African judge during the apartheid era, and its Chief Justice from 1982 to 1989.

Early life and education
Born in the Free State in 1917, Rabie matriculated at Koffiefontein in 1934. He then enrolled at the University of Stellenbosch where he obtained a BA degree, followed by a MA in Latin and a MA in Greek, all three degrees cum laude. After receiving a scholarship, he began his classical studies at the University of Michigan and was awarded the degree of Doctor of Philosophy in 1943.

After returning to South Africa, he taught in classical languages at the University of Stellenbosch and also began studying law and obtained his LLB (cum laude) at the end of 1948.

Career
Shortly after graduating, Rabie started practicing as an advocate at the Pretoria Bar and in 1962 he became a senior advocate. In 1966 he was appointed as a judge of the Transvaal Provincial Division of the Supreme Court. In 1970 he acted for the first time as a judge of the appellate division of the South African Supreme Court and 1971 he was permanently appointed to the Supreme Court of Appeal. In 1982 he was appointed as Chief Justice of South Africa.

References

1917 births
1997 deaths
South African judges
Chief justices of South Africa
University of Michigan alumni